395th may refer to:

395th Bombardment Group, inactive United States Air Force unit
395th Fighter Squadron or 181st Airlift Squadron, unit of the 136th Airlift Wing of the Texas Air National Guard
395th Infantry Regiment (United States), unit of the United States 99th Infantry Division
395th Strategic Missile Squadron, inactive United States Air Force unit

See also
395 (number)
395, the year 395 (CCCXCV) of the Julian calendar
395 BC